Cheon, Jung Hee is a South Korean mathematician and cryptographer whose research interest includes computational number theory, cryptography, and information security. He is one of the inventors of braid cryptography, one of group-based cryptography, and approximate homomorphic encryption HEAAN. As one of co-inventors of approximate homomorphic encryption HEaaN, he is actively working on homomorphic encryptions and their applications including machine learning, homomorphic control systems, and DNA computation on encrypted data. He is particularly known for his work on an efficient algorithm on strong DH problem. He received the best paper award in Asiacrypt 2008 for improving Pollard rho algorithm, and the best paper award in Eurocrypt 2015 for attacking Multilinear Maps. He was also selected as Scientist of the month by Korean government in 2018  and won the POSCO science prize in 2019.

He is a professor of Mathematical Sciences at the Seoul National University (SNU) and the director of IMDARC (the center for industrial math) in Seoul National University. He received Ph.D degrees in Mathematics from KAIST in 1997. Before joining SNU, he was in ETRI, Brown University, and ICU.

He is a program co-chair of ICISC 2008, MathCrypt 2013, ANTS-XI, Asiacrypt 2015, MathCrypt 2018/2019/2021, and PQC2021. 

 
 

 He is one of two invited speakers in Asiacrypt 2020. He also contributes academics as being an associate editor of “Design, Codes and cryptography”, “Journal of Communication network”, and “Journal of cryptology".

Awards 
The best paper award in Asiacrypt 2008

The best paper award in Eurocrypt 2015

The Scientist of the month by Korean government in Dec, 2018

POSCO science prize in 2019

PKC Test-of-Time award 2021

References

External links 
Faculty page at Seoul National University Department of Computer Science and Engineering

Number theorists
Living people
21st-century South Korean mathematicians
KAIST alumni
Academic staff of Seoul National University
1969 births
20th-century South Korean mathematicians